Belardi is an Italian surname. Notable people with the surname include:
Adone Belardi (born 1950), Venezuelan jockey
Antonio Belardi (born 1947), Venezuelan  horse trainer
Emanuele Belardi (born 1977), Italian footballer
Fred Belardi (born 1942), American politician
Wayne Belardi (1930–1993), American baseball player

See also
Belardi Auto Racing, an American racing team

Italian-language surnames